The 1997 Richmond Spiders football team was an American football team that represented the University of Richmond as a member of the Atlantic 10 Conference during the 1997 NCAA Division I-AA football season. In their third season under head coach Jim Reid, Richmond compiled a 6–5 record, with a mark of 4–4 in conference play, finishing tied for fourth place in the Mid-Atlantic division of the A-10.

Schedule

References

Richmond
Richmond Spiders football seasons
Richmond Spiders football